Busby is an unincorporated community in Elk County, Kansas, United States.

History
A post office was opened in Busby in 1885, and remained in operation until it was discontinued in 1906.

References

Further reading

External links
 Elk County maps: Current, Historic, KDOT

Unincorporated communities in Elk County, Kansas
Unincorporated communities in Kansas